Eliav is a communal settlement in south-central Israel. Located in Hevel Lakhish, it falls under the jurisdiction of Lakhish Regional Council.

History
Eliav was founded in 2004 and was initially named Haruv (חָרוּב) after the eponymous carob tree which grow in the region of the community. Secular, traditional and religious Jews live there and join as partners in education, Judaism and culture. The community supports the environment and is part of the ecosystem of the Shephelah. Planning and construction in the community is focused on preserving the environment.

In 2011, the name of the village changed to Eliav, in memory of Aryeh Eliav, a politician and activist.

References

Community settlements
Populated places in Southern District (Israel)
Populated places established in 2004
2004 establishments in Israel